The 2012 Vuelta a Asturias was the 56th edition of the Vuelta a Asturias road cycling stage race, which was held from 27 April to 29 April 2012. The race started in Oviedo and finished at Alto del Naranco.

General classification

References

Vuelta Asturias
2012 in road cycling
2012 in Spanish sport